South East Central Railway SC is an Indian institutional football club based in Mumbai, Maharashtra.

Overview
The club is the merger of three Indian football clubs – South Railway SC, Eastern Railway SC and Central Railway SC. They play their home matches on The Cooperage Ground in Mumbai. They are currently playing in the NFL 2nd Division and are one of the most popular Maharashtrian clubs in India.

Fans refer to them as the Railmen in English. They have recently improved a lot in their game under their current coach Santanu Ghosh. They have four Inter-Railway Trophies under their belt and added one memorable Khalifa Ziauddin Maharashtra State Club Championship in 2001. SEC Railway is voted as one of the prime contenders for the National Football League(India) 2nd Division.

Players

Current roster

Team management

Honours

Domestic tournaments
 Rovers Cup
 Runners-up (1): 1998
 Lal Bahadur Shastri Cup
 Runners-up (1): 2005

References

External links
 IndianFootball.com, Central Railway
 SoccerWay.com, NFL 2006/2007 2nd Division League Table
 The-AIFF.com, SEC Railway SC Squad Details

Football clubs in Mumbai
Organizations with year of establishment missing
Railway association football clubs in India